O Clone (English: The Clone) is a Brazilian telenovela created by Glória Perez and directed by Jayme Monjardim. Produced and aired by TV Globo, it was aired from 1 October 2001 to 15 June 2002, with 221 episodes. It also was an international success, selling in more than 90 countries.

Plot
In the early 1980s, Rio de Janeiro, Brazil; Jade (Giovanna Antonelli), a young Muslim girl, is orphaned when her mother dies and has to go to Morocco where her uncle Alí lives. The problem is that Jade was living in a country with a culture very different from that of an Islamic country. Thus, once she arrives in Morocco, she must learn all concomitant new traditions and customs, adjust to her new way of living, and face all the punishments she will be exposed to because of her conflicting personality and actions that go against her religion.

Back in Rio, a well-off family, the Ferraz, go to vacation in Morocco. Twin brothers Lucas and Diogo Ferraz (Murilo Benício), along with Leônidas (Reginaldo Faria), their father, and doctor Augusto Albieri (Juca de Oliveira), friend of the family and the twins Godfather who is a genetic scientist, visit Alí, a friend of Albieri's. There, Lucas and Jade meet for the first time, and they fall in love at first sight. Jade, knowing it's haraam (a sin) to love Lucas, decides to forgo her religious mandates for the sake of love, which prohibit her from marrying a non-Muslim person. 
Meanwhile, in Rio, Diogo tragically dies in a helicopter crash. Both Lucas and Leônidas are devastated by the news and Lucas' plans of running away with Jade are subsequently ruined. Albieri, his godparent, is shattered and becomes deeply despondent. He never recovered fully from the death of his fiancée, and Diogo's death reinvigorates his distress.

In an effort to change the natural course of events, Albieri in his despair resolves to utilize Lucas' cell in order to make the first human clone. Deusa (Adriana Lessa), a low-middle class woman who has not been able to get pregnant, is subsequently inseminated with Lucas' cell, and as a result gives birth to a baby, not knowing that it is a clone. Léo is born without complications, but Albieri wants to stay close to Léo and watch him grow up. Léo gradually becomes attached to Albieri, thus making Deusa uneasy.

Several years have passed since Léo was born. Now, Jade is married to Saíd (Dalton Vigh) and she's a mother of a little child, Khadija (Carla Diaz). She lives happily with her new family and is even starting to love Saíd. However, due to Said's insecurities a new encounter with Lucas is forced upon her to test Jade's love for him, with this encounter the old passion revives, but they're not the young lovers they once were and now they have new lives and new responsibilities. Lucas, who also is married, to Maysa (Daniela Escobar) and with a daughter, Mel (Débora Falabella) doesn't know he had been cloned 20 years before. Albieri had kept this a secret from everybody's knowledge and is trying to make it so that Léo and Lucas never meet and thus find out the truth. The last thing Albieri knew from Léo is that he and Deusa went to the north of Brazil, but with the return of both, Léo has become a young, handsome man, and the living image of the young Lucas whom Jade met in Morocco. The appearance of Leo in Brazil and his later travels to Morocco will change the life of all the characters forever.

Syndication
O Clone aired in Brazil comprising 221 episodes, of variable duration. However, when syndicated and sold to other countries the telenovela got the number of episodes enlarged to 250 and the duration fixed at 45 minutes. O Clone was a big hit, being aired in several countries all around the world. It was dubbed in several languages, with the Spanish version airing in the United States by Telemundo. There are also a few differences between the Brazilian soundtrack version and the syndicated one; some music was changed in order to make the people feel more identified, many Portuguese songs were changed to Hispanic American music when it aired to the Hispanics in the United States. See Soundtrack to see the list of music featured in the telenovela. Also, the Brazilian opening features the song "Sob o Sol" by Sagrado Coração da Terra, and the syndicated opening features the same video, but the music is replaced by "Maktub" by Marcus Viana.

Cast

Portrayal of Muslims
While the telenovela's attention to issues of drug addiction won its creator an award, the portrayal of Arab-Muslim cultures has brought a critical response from different Arab-Muslim sources, according to a 2005 doctoral dissertation written about the program by Elizabeth Barbosa.

The part of the telenovela dealing with Islamic customs and attitudes mixes traditions from diverse countries, rather than those of Morocco alone, and has been criticised for its inaccurate representation of these traditions, according to Barbosa. These criticisms include the portrayal of polygamy as commonly accepted in Morocco, women as rarely working outside the home or pursuing an advanced education, and women having only unimportant roles within the family. Critics making these judgments included sheik Abdelmalek Cherkaoui Ghazouani, the Moroccan ambassador to Brazil, who considered the high profile of these representations to merit his posting his criticisms directly on his embassy's website as part of a bulletin board.

Reception

Ratings 

In its premiere, O Clone registered a viewership rating of 47 points, peaking at 53 points.

Its ever lowest recorded data in terms of viewership was on the New Year's Eve of 31 December 2001.

On the episode of the first between Lucas and his clone registered  56 points and 63 points peak, with 73% audience share.

In its finale, O Clone registered a viewership rating of 62 points peaking at 68 and 77% audience share.

O Clone registered a mean viewership rating of 47 points.

Remake
In January 2010, a remake in Spanish started to be recorded in Colombia. This remake is a production of TV Globo and Telemundo and it was titled El Clon.

References

External links

oclone.net
theclon.narod.ru

2001 telenovelas
2001 Brazilian television series debuts
2002 Brazilian television series endings
Brazilian telenovelas
Brazilian science fiction television series
2000s romantic drama television series
Television series about cloning
TV Globo telenovelas
Telenovelas by Glória Perez
Television shows set in Rio de Janeiro (city)
Television shows set in Morocco
Portuguese-language telenovelas
Television series about twins
Fiction about substance abuse
Television series about Islam